Larry Frisoli (August 22, 1950 – July 2, 2008) was the Republican Party candidate for Attorney General in Massachusetts in 2006.

Frisoli, who was born in Cambridge, Massachusetts and was a Boston University and Suffolk University Law School graduate, was Vice-Mayor of Cambridge and Assistant District Attorney for Norfolk County. He was also elected "Lawyer of the Year" by Massachusetts Lawyers Weekly. He lost to Martha Coakley for Massachusetts Attorney General, a position previously held by Thomas Reilly.

External links
 Frisoli's official website

1950 births
2008 deaths
Suffolk University Law School alumni
Boston University alumni
Massachusetts Republicans